Sergei Lysenko may refer to:

 Sergei Lysenko (footballer, born 1972), Russian football player
 Sergei Lysenko (footballer, born 1976), Russian football player